"Heartbreaking World", released Oct. 1985, was the third UK single released from Squeeze's sixth album, Cosi Fan Tutti Frutti. While every other Squeeze single was written by the team of Chris Difford and Glenn Tilbrook, this one was penned by Difford and keyboardist Jools Holland.  This is also the only Squeeze single to feature a lead vocal by Holland. Holland's younger brother Chris Holland also plays emulator on this track.

Track listing

7"
 "Heartbreaking World" (5:07)
 "Big Beng" (4:02)

10"
 "Heartbreaking World" (5:07)
 "Big Beng" (4:02)
 "By Your Side (live)" (4:32)
 "Tempted (live)" (4:16)

External links
Squeeze discography at Squeezenet

Squeeze (band) songs
1985 singles
Songs written by Chris Difford
1985 songs